The men's doubles tournament at the 1986 French Open was held from 26 May until 8 June 1986 on the outdoor clay courts at the Stade Roland Garros in Paris, France. John Fitzgerald and Tomáš Šmíd won the title, defeating Stefan Edberg and Anders Järryd in the final.

Seeds

Draw

Finals

Top half

Section 1

Section 2

Bottom half

Section 3

Section 4

External links
 Association of Tennis Professionals (ATP) – main draw
1986 French Open – Men's draws and results at the International Tennis Federation

Men's Doubles
French Open by year – Men's doubles